Christopher Stetson Boal, better known as Chris Boal, is an American playwright and screenwriter. Before he became a screenwriter, Boal worked as a playwright. He is the half-brother of screenwriter Mark Boal.

In 2006, Boal wrote Crazy for the Dog, a comedic melodrama aimed a dissecting contemporary family dynamics. The production played at Bouwerie Lane Theater. In 2009, Boal wrote 23 Knives, a Julius Caesar murder explanation shown in repertory at the Clurman Theater. In 2010, Boal wrote Order, directed by Tony Award nominated Austin Pendleton, which was shown at the Kirk Theater at Theatre Row (New York City). Boal wrote Pimm's Mission, playing July - August 2015 at 59E59 Theaters . All four productions starred longtime friend and collaborator, Ryan Tramont.

Boal is also the creator of The Continuing Adventures of Dick Danger, as well as Bad Guys Don't Know Dick - the Musical, and the award-winning short film Walking Charlie. A Hope for this World won an audience award at the Edinburgh Festival Fringe.

Boal is currently writing a reboot of Zorro for Sony Pictures.

References

Living people
Date of birth missing (living people)
American dramatists and playwrights
American male screenwriters
Writers from New York City
American male dramatists and playwrights
Screenwriters from New York (state)
Year of birth missing (living people)